The New Zealand national cricket team toured Zimbabwe from 14 October to 6 November 2011. The tour consisted of two Twenty20 Internationals (T20Is), three One Day Internationals (ODIs) and one Test.

Squads

Tour matches

Two-day: Zimbabwe XI v New Zealanders

T20I series

1st T20I

2nd T20I

ODI series

1st ODI

2nd ODI

3rd ODI

Test series

Only Test

References

2011–12 Zimbabwean cricket season
Zimbabwe
International cricket competitions in 2011–12
2011-12